Khan Chong is a subdistrict in Wat Bot District of Phitsanulok Province, Thailand.

Geography
Khan Chong lies in the Nan Basin, which is part of the Chao Phraya Watershed.

Administration
Khan Chong is administered by a tambon administrative organization (TAO) and is subdivided into 10 smaller divisions called villages (muban). The villages in Khan Chong are as follows:

Khwae Noi National Reserved Forest

The Khwae Noi National Reserved Forest, recently made part of Kaeng Chet Khwae National Park, covers a significant portion of the land in Khan Chong.

Sufficiency Economy Village Project
A Sufficiency Economy Village Project is at Ban Nam Chon. Part of the project is a Handicraft Village Project, which produces carved works, furniture, and other products from the wood gathered from the newly flooded area of the Khwae Noi Dam Project. It is a community project aimed at increasing local family income.

Temples
The following is a list of active Buddhist temples in Khan Chong:
Wat Khan Chong Wanaram in Ban Khan Chong
Wat Nong Luak in Ban Nong Luak
Wat Huai Chiang in Ban Huai Chiang
Wat Nam Chon in Ban Nam Chon
Wat Ta-khian Tia in Ban Nong Krabak
Wat Nong Bon in Ban Nong Bon

References

Tambon of Phitsanulok province
Populated places in Phitsanulok province